Toll Bar End is an area of Coventry, England, that lies on the South East edge of the city. The focal point of the area is the Toll Bar Island, where the A45, A46 and B4110 (London Road) converge. It is a main transport route out of the city and provides access to Coventry Airport and Middlemarch Business Park. Another area of interest is Gary C King museum, that specialises in the Coventry motor industry; the demolished Peugeot Ryton plant lies close by along the A45.

Suburbs of Coventry